Schistophleps bipuncta is a moth in the subfamily Arctiinae. It was described by George Hampson in 1891. It is found in India (Assam, Belgaum, Nilgiris), Sri Lanka and Myanmar.

Description
Its wingspan is about 21 mm. It is an ochreous semi-diaphanous whitish moth. Forewings with an indistinct antemedial rufous line with some fuscous suffusion on it inner edge. There are black specks at center and end of cell. Postmedial discal area is suffused with rufus. A series of indistinct submarginal streaks and marginal specks present. Hindwings are hyaline (glass like).

References

Moths described in 1891
Nudariina